Frederick Stanley Boardman (February 18, 1851 – April 12, 1941) was an American baseball player. Boardman was born in 1851 in St. Joseph, Missouri. According to baseball historian David Nemec, he was an "auxiliary player" in Chicago for many years. He appeared in one game in Major League Baseball as a right fielder for the Baltimore Canaries in the National Association during the 1874 baseball season. His lone appearance with the Canaries came about when the team visited Chicago and was in need of an outfielder. The Chicago White Stockings won the game by a 4–0 score. During the 1875 season, he worked as an umpire in the National Association. He died in 1941 in Indianapolis, at age 90.

References

External links

Major League Baseball right fielders
19th-century baseball players
Baltimore Canaries players
Baseball players from Chicago
1851 births
1941 deaths